Markéta Ringelová (born 25 July 1989) is a Czech football player, who plays for Hradec Králové in Czech Women's Second League.

She is a member of the Czech national team. Ringelová received her first call-up to the senior team in August 2007. She made her debut for the national team on 26 August 2007 in a match against Belarus.

Growing up, Ringelová attended the Sportovní gymnázium (sports gymnasium) in Pardubice. In 2008, she was among a number of alumni awarded recognition by the school.

References

External links
 
 
 

1989 births
Living people
Czech women's footballers
Czech expatriate women's footballers
Czech Republic women's international footballers
Sportspeople from Hradec Králové
Women's association football midfielders
AC Sparta Praha (women) players
Czech Women's First League players
ÖFB-Frauenliga players
Czech expatriate sportspeople in Austria
Expatriate women's footballers in Austria